Peter Zhang Bairen (February 14, 1915 – October 12, 2005) was the unofficial Bishop of Hanyang, China.

Chinese authorities did not officially recognize Bishop Peter Zhang; however, he was officially consecrated as a monsignor within the Roman Catholic Church in 1986, by Liu Hede, the unofficial Bishop of Hankou.

Monsignor Zhang spent twenty-four years in prison and labor camps following his continued loyalty to the Pope (1955–1979). In an unusual concession, local authorities permitted Zhang's funeral services to be open to the public.

The funeral took place in October and was attended by both official and unofficial clergy members.

References

1915 births
2005 deaths
20th-century Roman Catholic bishops in China